Bowne & Co., Inc. was an American company founded in 1775 by Robert Bowne. It provided financial, marketing, and business communications services internationally. From its initial listing on the New York Stock Exchange until its acquisition in 2010, Bowne was the oldest publicly traded company in the United States. 

In 1975, Bowne & Co., Inc. partnered with the South Street Seaport Museum to open a 19th-century-style print shop in the historic Seaport district of New York City. This print shop, billed as the oldest continuously running business in New York City, operates at 211 Water Street as Bowne & Co., Stationers. 

Excluding Bowne & Co., Stationers, RR Donnelley acquired and completely absorbed Bowne & Co., Inc. in 2010.

References

Defunct companies based in New York City
Service companies of the United States
Financial services companies established in 1775
Companies formerly listed on the New York Stock Exchange
RR Donnelley